Balochistan is a province of Pakistan. Located in the southwestern region of the country, Balochistan is the largest province of Pakistan by land area but is the least populated one. It is bordered by the Pakistani provinces of Khyber Pakhtunkhwa to the north-east, Punjab to the east and Sindh to the south-east; shares international borders with Iran to the west and Afghanistan to the north; and is bound by the Arabian Sea to the south. Balochistan is an extensive plateau of rough terrain divided into basins by ranges of sufficient heights and ruggedness. It has the world's largest deep sea port, the Port of Gwadar lying in the Arabian Sea.

Although it makes up about 44% of the land area of Pakistan, only 5% of it is arable and it is noted for an extremely dry desert climate. Despite this, agriculture and livestock make up about 47% of Balochistan's economy. 

The name "Balochistan" means "the land of the Baloch". Largely underdeveloped, its economy is also dominated by natural resources, especially its natural gas fields. Aside from Quetta, the second-largest city of the province is Turbat in the south, while another area of major economic importance is port city of Gwadar on the Arabian Sea, an emerging future business hub.

History

Early history

Balochistan occupies the very southeastern most portion of the Iranian Plateau, the setting for the earliest known farming settlements in the pre-Indus Valley civilisation era, the earliest of which was Mehrgarh, dated at 7000 BCE, within the province. Balochistan marked the westernmost extent of civilisation. Centuries before the arrival of Islam in the seventh century, parts of Balochistan were ruled by the Paratarajas, an Indo-Scythian dynasty. At certain times, the Kushans also held political sway in parts of Balochistan.

The Hindu Sewa Dynasty ruled parts of Balochistan, chiefly Kalat. The Sibi Division, which was carved out of Quetta Division and Kalat Division in 1974, derives its name from Rani Sewi, the queen of the Sewa dynasty. 

The remnants of the earliest people in Balochistan were the Brahui people, a Dravidian speaking people. The Brahuis retained the Dravidian language throughout the millennias.

Although during the Stone and Bronze ages and Alexander the Great’s empire an indigenous population existed, the Baloch people themselves did not enter the region until the 14th century CE.  A theory of the origin of the Baloch people, the largest ethnic group in the region, is that they are of Median descent.

Arrival of Islam
In 654, Abdulrehman ibn Samrah, governor of Sistan and the newly emerged Rashidun caliphate at the expense of Sassanid Persia and the Byzantine Empire, sent an Islamic army to crush a revolt in Zaranj, which is now in southern Afghanistan. After conquering Zaranj, a column of the army pushed north, conquering Kabul and Ghazni, in the Hindu Kush mountain range, while another column moved through Quetta District in north-western Balochistan and conquered the area up to the ancient cities of Dawar and Qandabil (Bolan). It is documented that the major settlements, falling within today's province, became in 654 controlled by the Rashidun caliphate, except for the well-defended mountain town of QaiQan which is now Kalat.

During the caliphate of Ali, a revolt broke out in southern Balochistan's Makran region. In 663, during the reign of Umayyad Caliph Muawiyah I, his Muslim rule lost control of north-eastern Balochistan and Kalat when Haris ibn Marah and a large part of his army died in battle against a revolt in Kalat.

Pre-modern era
In the 15th century, Mir Chakar Khan Rind became the first Sirdar of Afghani, Irani and Pakistani Balochistan. He was a close aide of the Timurid ruler Humayun, and was succeeded by the Khanate of Kalat, which owed allegiance to the Mughal Empire. Later, Nader Shah won the allegiance of the rulers of eastern Balochistan. He ceded Kalhora, one of the Sindh territories of Sibi-Kachi, to the Khanate of Kalat. Ahmad Shah Durrani, founder of the Afghan Empire, also won the allegiance of that area's rulers, and many Baloch fought under him during the Third Battle of Panipat. Most of the area would eventually revert to local Baloch control after Afghan rule.

British Indian era

In 1876, northern Baluchistan became one of the Presidencies and provinces of British India in colonial India. During this time from the fall of the Durrani Empire in 1823, four princely states were recognised and reinforced in Balochistan: Makran, Kharan, Las Bela and Kalat. In 1876, Robert Sandeman negotiated the Treaty of Kalat, which brought the Khan's territories, including Kharan, Makran, and Las Bela, under British protection, even though they remained independent princely states. After the Second Afghan War was ended by the Treaty of Gandamak in May 1879, the Afghan Emir ceded the districts of Quetta, Pishin, Harnai, Sibi and Thal Chotiali to British control. On 1 April 1883, the British took control of the Bolan Pass, south-east of Quetta, from the Khan of Kalat. In 1887, small additional areas of Balochistan were declared British territory. In 1893, Sir Mortimer Durand negotiated an agreement with the Amir of Afghanistan, Abdur Rahman Khan, to fix the Durand Line running from Chitral to Balochistan as the boundary between the Emirate of Afghanistan and British-controlled areas. Two devastating earthquakes occurred in Balochistan during British colonial rule: the 1935 Quetta earthquake, which devastated Quetta, and the 1945 Balochistan earthquake with its epicentre in the Makran region. During the time of the Indian independence movement, "three pro-Congress parties were still active in Balochistan's politics apart from Balochistan's Muslim League", such as the Anjuman-i-Watan Baluchistan, which favoured a united India and opposed its partition.

After independence

In British-ruled Colonial India, Baluchistan contained a Chief Commissioner's province and princely states (including Kalat, Makran, Las Bela and Kharan) that became a part of Pakistan. The province's Shahi Jirga (the grand council of tribal elders) and the non-official members of the Quetta Municipality, according to the Pakistani narrative, agreed to join Pakistan unanimously on 29 June 1947; however, the Shahi Jirga was stripped of its members from the Kalat State prior to the vote. The then-president of the Baluchistan Muslim League, Qazi Muhammad Isa, informed Muhammad Ali Jinnah that "Shahi Jirga in no way represents the popular wishes of the masses" and that members of the Kalat State were "excluded from voting; only representatives from the British part of the province voted and the British part included the leased areas of Quetta, Nasirabad Tehsil, Nushki and Bolan Agency." Following the referendum, on 22 June 1947 the Khan of Kalat received a letter from members of the Shahi Jirga, as well as sardars from the leased areas of Baluchistan, stating that they, "as a part of the Baloch nation, were a part of the Kalat state too" and that if the question of Baluchistan's accession to Pakistan arise, "they should be deemed part of the Kalat state rather than (British) Balochistan". This has brought into question whether an actual vote took place. Political scientist Salman Rafi Sheikh, in locating the origins of the insurgency in Balochistan, says "that Balochistan's accession to Pakistan was, as against the officially projected narrative, not based upon consensus, nor was support for Pakistan overwhelming. What this manipulation indicates is that even before formally becoming a part of Pakistan, Balochistan had fallen a prey to political victimization."

Initially aspiring for independence, the Khan of Kalat finally acceded to Pakistan on 27 March 1948 after period of negotiations with Pakistan. The signing of the Instrument of Accession by Ahmad Yar Khan led his brother, Prince Abdul Karim, to revolt against his brother's decision due to their family rift. in July 1948. Princes Agha Abdul Karim Baloch and Muhammad Rahim refused to lay down arms, leading the Dosht-e Jhalawan in unconventional attacks on the army until 1950. The Prince indulged in Terror activities without any assistance from others. Jinnah and his successors allowed Yar Khan to retain his title until the province's dissolution in 1955.

Insurgencies by Baloch nationalists took place in 1948, 1958–59, 1962–63 and 1973–77, with a new ongoing insurgency by autonomy-seeking Baloch groups since 2003. While many Baloch support the demand for autonomy, the majority are not interested in seceding from Pakistan.

At a press conference on 8 June 2015 in Quetta, Balochistan's Home Minister Sarfraz Bugti accused India's prime minister Narendra Modi of openly supporting terrorism. Bugti implicated India's Research and Analysis Wing (RAW) of being responsible for recent attacks at military bases in Smangli and Khalid, and for subverting the China–Pakistan Economic Corridor (CPEC) agreement.

Gwadar, a region of Balochistan was a Colony of Oman for more than a century and in the 1960s, Pakistan took over the land. Many people in this region are therefore Omani.

Geography

It is Pakistan's largest province by area, constituting 44% of Pakistan's total landmass. The province is bordered by Afghanistan to the north and north-west, Iran to the south-west, Punjab and Sindh, and Khyber Pakhtunkhwa and the Federally Administered Tribal Areas to the north-east. To the south lies the Arabian Sea. Balochistan is located on the south-eastern part of the Iranian plateau. It borders the geopolitical regions of the Middle East and Southwest Asia, Central Asia and South Asia. Balochistan lies at the mouth of the Strait of Hormuz and provides the shortest route from seaports to Central Asia. Its geographical location has placed the otherwise desolate region in the scope of competing for global interests for all of recorded history.

The capital city Quetta is located in a densely populated portion of the Sulaiman Mountains in the northeast of the province. It is situated in a river valley near the Bolan Pass, which has been used as the route of choice from the coast to Central Asia, entering through Afghanistan's Kandahar region. The British and other historic empires have crossed the region to invade Afghanistan by this route.

Balochistan is rich in exhaustible and renewable resources; it is the second major supplier of natural gas in Pakistan. The province's renewable and human resource potential has not been systematically measured or exploited. Local inhabitants have chosen to live in towns and have relied on sustainable water sources for thousands of years.

Climate
The climate of the upper highlands is characterised by very cold winters and hot summers. Winters are mild on the plains, with temperatures never falling below freezing point. Summers are hot and dry, especially in the arid zones of Chagai and Kharan districts. The plains are also very hot in summer, with temperatures reaching . The record highest temperature, was recorded in Sibi on 26 May 2010, exceeding the previous record, . Other hot areas include Turbat and Dalbandin. The desert climate is characterised by hot and very arid conditions. Occasionally, strong windstorms make these areas very inhospitable.

Government and politics

In common with the other provinces of Pakistan, Balochistan has a parliamentary form of government. The ceremonial head of the province is the Governor, who is appointed by the President of Pakistan on the advice of the provincial Chief Minister. The Chief Minister, the province's chief executive, is normally the leader of the largest political party or alliance of parties in the provincial assembly.

The unicameral Provincial Assembly of Balochistan comprises 65 seats of which 11 are reserved for women and 3 reserved for non-Muslims. The judicial branch of government is carried out by the Balochistan High Court, which is based in Quetta and headed by a Chief Justice.

Besides dominant Pakistan-wide political parties (such as the Pakistan Muslim League (N) and the Pakistan Peoples Party), Balochistan nationalist parties (such as the National Party and the Balochistan National Party (Mengal)) have been prominent in the province.

Administrative divisions 

For administrative purposes, the province is divided into seven divisions: Kalat, Makran, Nasirabad, Quetta, Sibi, Zhob and Rakhshan. This divisional level was abolished in 2000, but restored after the 2008 election. Each division is under an appointed commissioner. The seven divisions are further subdivided into 33 districts:

As of June 2021, there are eight divisions. The eighth division, Loralai Division was created by bifurcating Zhob Division.

Demographics

Balochistan's population density is low due to the mountainous terrain and scarcity of water. In March 2012, preliminary census figures showed that the population of Balochistan, not including the districts of Khuzdar, Kech and Panjgur, had reached 13,162,222, an increase of 139.3% from 5,501,164 in 1998. The population constituted 6.85% of Pakistan's total population. This was the largest increase in population in any province of Pakistan during that time period, almost thrice the national increase of 46.9%. Official estimates of Balochistan's population grew from approximately 7.45 million in 2003 to 7.8 million in 2005. The 2017 Census enumerated a population of 12,344,408.

Languages and ethnicities 

According to the preliminary results of the 2017 census, the languages with the most native speakers in the province are Balochi, spoken by 35.49% of the population, and Pashto, whose share at 35.34% is a marked increase on the 1998 census, when it stood at 29.6%. The Pasthuns mainly inhabit the north of Balochistan and form the majority in Quetta. Baloch on the other hand are found throughout Balochistan, but most highly concentrated in the west and south of the province. Brahui is spoken by 17.12% mainly in the central part of Balochistan. Other languages include Sindhi (%), Saraiki (%), Punjabi (%), and Urdu (%).

Balochi forms the majority in 21 districts and Pashto forms majority in 9 districts of Balochistan. Brahui has majority in 4 districts. In the Lasbela District, a large minority of the population speaks Lasi, which is a dialect of Sindhi.

According to the Ethnologue, households speaking Balochi, whose primary dialect is Makrani constitutes 13%, Rukhshani 10%, Sulemani 7%, and Khetrani 3% of the population. Other languages spoken are Lasi, Urdu, Punjabi, Hazargi, Sindhi, Saraiki, Dehvari, Dari, Tajik, Hindko, Uzbek, and Hindki.

The 2005 census concerning Afghans in Pakistan showed that a total of 769,268 Afghan refugees were temporarily staying in Balochistan. However, there are probably fewer Afghans living in Balochistan today as many refugees repatriated in 2013. As of 2015, there are only 327,778 registered Afghan refugees according to the UNHCR.

Religion

According to the 2017 Census, nearly all of the population of Balochistan were Muslims. There were also Hindu and Christian minorities in the province. The Hindu population in the province was approximately 49,133 (including the Scheduled Castes). The Shri Hinglaj Mata mandir which is the largest Hindu pilgrimage centre in Pakistan is situated in Balochistan. There was also a Christian minority of 26,462 individuals in the province.

Education

The literacy rate of the province in 2017 was 43.6%, an increase from 24.8% in 1998.

Medical colleges

 Bolan University of Medical & Health Sciences
 Makran Medical College

Engineering universities

 Balochistan University of Engineering and Technology, Khuzdar
 Balochistan University of Information Technology, Engineering and Management Sciences, Quetta

General universities

 University of Balochistan, Quetta
 Al-Hamd Islamic University, Quetta
 Sardar Bahadur Khan Women's University, Quetta
 Lasbela University of Agriculture, Water and Marine Sciences, Lasbela
 University of Turbat, Turbat
 University of Loralai, Loralai

Economy

The economy of Balochistan is largely based upon agriculture, livestock, fisheries, production of natural gas, coal and other minerals. 

Though agriculture and livestock play a dominant role in the provincial economy by contributing 47% of its GDP, it faced intense damages due to the 2022 Pakistan floods. The floods killed around 500,000 of Balochistan's livestock and damaged cultivation and agricultural output in 32 out of 35 districts of the province. The Lasbela district was the worst hit as the floods washed away fourt-fifth's of the homes, crops and livestock. Due to the floods and severe drought conditions, the province faces food insecurity and is 85% dependent on the Sindh and Punjab provinces for the supply of wheat.

Furthermore with the exception of Quetta, Balochistan has been called a "neglected province where a majority of population lacks amenities". Although the province is rich in natural resources capable of uplifting it's economy, most of them have not been fully utilised for the welfare of the population and are yet to be explored or developed.

Since the mid-1970s the province's contribution to Pakistan's GDP has dropped from 4.9 to 3.7%, and as of 2007 it had the highest poverty rate and infant and maternal mortality rate, and the lowest literacy rate in comparison to other provinces, factors some allege have contributed to the insurgency. However, in seventh NFC awards, Punjab province and Federal contributed to increase Baluchistan share more than its entitled population based share. In Balochistan poverty is increasing. In 2001–2002 poverty incidences were at 48% and by 2005–2006 these were at 50.9%. According to a report on Dawn, the rate of multidimensional poverty in Balochistan had risen to 71% by 2016.

Several major development projects, including the construction of a new deep sea port at the strategically important town of Gwadar, are in progress in Balochistan. The port is projected to be the hub of an energy and trade corridor to and from China, Middle East and the Central Asian republics. In the district Lasbela, there is an oil refinery owned by Byco International Incorporated (BII), which is capable of processing 120,000 barrels of oil per day. A power station is located adjacent to the refinery. Several cement plants and a marble factory are also located there. One of the world's largest ship breaking yards is located on the coast.

Natural resource extraction
Balochistan's share of Pakistan's national income has historically ranged between 3.7% to 4.9%. Since 1972, Balochistan's gross income has grown in size by 2.7 times. Outside Quetta, the resource extraction infrastructure of the province is gradually developing but still lags far behind other parts of Pakistan.

The agreements for royalty rights and ownership of mineral rights were reached during a period of unprecedented natural disasters, economic, social, political, and cultural unrest in Pakistan. The negotiations were widely considered to be insufficiently transparent.

Culture

Tourism

Places of interest

Following is a list of a few tourist attractions and places of interest in Balochistan:

 Astola Island
 Bolan Pass
 Dureji
 Gadani Beach
 Gadani Ship Breaking Yard
 Gwadar
 Hanna Lake
 Hazarganji-Chiltan National Park, near Quetta.
 Hinglaj Mata Temples
 Hingol National Park
 Hub Dam
 Jiwani Coastal Wetland
 Khuzdar
 Kund Malir
 Makran Coastal Highway
 Mehrgarh
 Moola Chotok
 Pir Ghaib Waterfall, Balochistan
 Quaid-e-Azam Residency
 Quetta
 The princess of hope, Balochistan
 Urak Valley
 Zhob
 Ziarat Juniper Forest
 Ziarat

Villages
 

Kappar
Lahor

See also

 Balochistan (geographic region)
 Balochistan, Afghanistan
 Balochistan, Iran
 Goth Gorshani
 List of cities in Balochistan, Pakistan by population
 List of cultural heritage sites in Balochistan, Pakistan
 Insurgency in Balochistan
 Randghar China

References

Further reading
 
Philippe Fabry, Balouchistan, le désert insoumis, Paris, Nathan Image, 1991, 136 p.,

External links 

 
 Sibi District   
 Guide to Balochistan
 Balochistan Archives- Preserving our Past
 

 
Provinces of Pakistan
States and territories established in 1970
1970 establishments in Pakistan
Balochi-speaking countries and territories